Fălești is a district in the north of Moldova, with the administrative center at Fălești.
As of January 1, 2011, its population was 92,600.

It borders Romania, in Western Moldova.

History
District towns, with the earliest historical attestation are Fălești, Scumpia, Călugăr, Horești first attested in the period 1429–1437. Especially in the fifteenth to seventeenth centuries, this region developed economically (trade) and culturally, as there was a significant increase in population. In the 18th century, as a result of the constant wars waged by the Principality of Moldavia and the Ottoman Empire, and later more frequent interventions of the Russian army, the region was in decline. In 1812, following the Treaty of Bucharest, the Russian Empire occupied Basarabia at the expense of the Principality of Moldavia. During this period, czarist government policy was one of Russification of the native population, with many Ukrainians and Russians arriving, whose descendants represent currently 15% of the population of the district. In 1918 after the collapse of Russian Empire, Basarabia decided to unite with Romania. In 1940, following the Molotov-Ribbentrop Treaty, Basarabia again was ceded, this time to the USSR. In the period 1944–1991, the Falesti district center was a part of the MSSR. In 1991 as a result of the proclamation of Independence of Moldova, it was part of the Ungheni County (1991-2003), and in 2003 an administrative unit of Moldova.

Geography
Fălești District is located in west-central part of Moldova is nearby with: Glodeni District in north, Bălți municipality in the north-east, Sîngerei District in east, south Ungheni District, and state border with Romania in the west. The landscape is fragmented, in the south of district, split a few branches of the Central Moldavian Plateau. Otherwise the landscape is crossed by many rivers. There's a process with a mild slip. Maximum altitude in the district is isolated hill Magura, reaching 389 meters.

Climate
Climatic conditions are characterized by the general movement of atmospheric air masses from west to east. The climate is temperate continental. Four seasons are well defined: summer (21-21.5 °C) and winter (-4.5-5 °C). Yearly precipitation 500–600 mm. Average wind speed 4–6 m/s.

Fauna
Fauna is represented by hares, foxes, deer, wild boars, wolves rarely wild cats, otters,  raccoon dogs, etc. Species of birds seen include storks, wild ducks, woodpeckers, tits, partridges, egrets, gulls, etc.

Flora
Forests occupy 10.4% of the district and include  oak, beech, hornbeam, maple, acacia, cherry and others. Plant (steppe): clover, fescue, bells, wormwood, knotweed and others.

Rivers
District is located in the basin of the Prut River, which crosses the district in the west to the border with Romania, but in the eastern, part of the Răut River basin, with its tributaries Ciuluicul Mare and Ciuluicul Mijlociu. Rich in ponds and streams, the district is a source of fish: carp, crucian carp, perch.

Administrative subdivisions
Localities: 76
Administrative centers: Făleşti
Cities: Făleşti
Communes: 32
Villages: 43

Demographics
1 January 2012 the district population was 92,400 of which 19.3% urban and 80.7% rural population.

Births (2010): 1098 (11.8 per 1000)
Deaths (2010): 1301 (14.0 per 1000)
Growth rate (2010): -203 (-2.2 per 1000)

Ethnic groups 

Footnote: * There is an ongoing controversy regarding the ethnic identification of Moldovans and Romanians.

Religion 
Christians - 98.0%
Orthodox Christians - 95.4%
Protestant - 2.1%
Baptists - 1.5%
Pentecostals - 0.3%
Seventh-day Adventists - 0.2%
Evangelicals - 0.1%
Old Believers - 0.5%
Other - 1.3%
No Religion - 0.5%
Atheists - 0.2%

Economy
Falesti territory activates: 12,412 active traders, including 10,500 - farms, 1101 - Individual enterprises, 813 - businesses with the right person, and 622 - entrepreneurial patent owners. Main branch of economy is agriculture, is growing cereals (barley, wheat, oats), vegetables, tobacco, sunflower and permanent crops: orchards (apple, cherry, hair) and vines.

Education
Working in district 52 middle and high schools, including 24 secondary schools, 14 schools, 10 general schools, 2 special schools, a vocational school and a boarding gymnasium.

Politics
District is located in the so-called electoral region "North Red" (the region where the PCRM usually get over 50% of the vote). But after the 2010 elections communists lose to the AEI.

During the last three elections AEI had an increase of 137.7%.

Elections

|-
!style="background-color:#E9E9E9" align=center colspan="2" valign=center|Parties and coalitions
!style="background-color:#E9E9E9" align=right|Votes
!style="background-color:#E9E9E9" align=right|%
!style="background-color:#E9E9E9" align=right|+/−
|-
| 
|align=left|Party of Communists of the Republic of Moldova
|align="right"|19,532
|align="right"|47.65
|align="right"|−4.44
|-
| 
|align=left|Liberal Democratic Party of Moldova
|align="right"|10,603
|align="right"|25.87
|align="right"|+12.22
|-
| 
|align=left|Democratic Party of Moldova
|align="right"|6,436
|align="right"|15,70
|align="right"|-1.44
|-
| 
|align=left|Liberal Party
|align="right"|1,527
|align="right"|3.73
|align="right"|−3.82
|-
| 
|align=left|Party Alliance Our Moldova
|align="right"|1,041
|align="right"|2.54
|align="right"|−2.03
|-
|bgcolor="grey"|
|align=left|Other Party
|align="right"|1,863
|align="right"|4.51
|align="right"|-0.49
|-
|align=left style="background-color:#E9E9E9" colspan="2"|Total (turnout 57.65%)
|width="30" align="right" style="background-color:#E9E9E9"|41,326
|width="30" align="right" style="background-color:#E9E9E9"|100.00
|width="30" align="right" style="background-color:#E9E9E9"|

Culture
Network of cultural institutions in the district include 121 units, including: houses, homes of culture 63, libraries 54, a school of music, two art schools and museums.

Health
The district works: Falesti Hospital, medical points in all villages, and state pharmacy with 53 branches.

Personalities

 Ilie Ilașcu - Politician, famous for being sentenced to death by the separatist Transnistrian government for alleged involvement in two murders and for actions which have been described Moldova
 Vadim Vacarciuc - World Champion in weightlifting in 1997, earned a silver medal in 2000 European Weightlifting Championships
 Diana Misnei - Famous fashion star and designer was born in Glijeni, her early career started in Chisinau and after building her portfolio and name she moved to London to conquer the fashion world. Usually Diana is always talking about Glijeni's impact on her lifestyle and how the region is playing a crucial role for her inspiration in future collection.

References

 
Districts of Moldova